Harold Naunton Davies MBE (born 17 November 1903 - died 12 July 2009) was an Australian civil engineer.

Davies was educated at Ashfield Boys High School and at The University of Sydney, where he was awarded Bachelor of Engineering degree.

Davies was an assistant to John Bradfield in the design and construction of the Sydney Harbour Bridge.

During World War II, Davies designed "build by numbers" airfield buildings and accommodation for soldiers. They could be constructed by the servicemen themselves, instead of specialists.

References

1903 births
2009 deaths
Australian civil engineers
People educated at Ashfield Boys' High School
University of Sydney alumni
Australian recipients of the British Empire Medal
Engineers from Sydney
Australian centenarians
Men centenarians